Bandar Abbas County is in Hormozgan province, Iran. The capital of the county is the city of Bandar Abbas. At the 2006 census, the county's population was 498,644 in 119,485 households. The following census in 2011 counted 588,288 people in 158,677 households. At the 2016 census, the county's population was 680,366 in 196,220 households.

Administrative divisions

The population history and structural changes of Bandar Abbas County's administrative divisions over three consecutive censuses are shown in the following table. The latest census shows four districts, 11 rural districts, and five cities.

References

 

Counties of Hormozgan Province